"Nasty Dan" is an American folk song written by Jeff Moss, who also wrote "Rubber Duckie". It was first recorded and released by Johnny Cash in 1975. A version of the song is on his album The Johnny Cash Children's Album. Cash performed the song for Oscar the Grouch on Sesame Street, telling The Grouch, "You'll like this."

According to the song, Nasty Dan was a nasty man. He ate nails for lunch, never took a bath or laughed, and would jump for joy when a little boy would trip and fall. The only words he ever said were: I don't like you at all. He eventually met Nasty Pearl, a nasty girl, and they settled down and had a nasty kid.

Moss included a poem of the same name in his book of poetry.

The song became a No. 1 hit in France in 1976 for Claude François, who recorded it with French lyrics under the title "Sale Bonhomme".

References

1975 songs
Johnny Cash songs
1976 singles
American folk songs